Comet Zhu–Balam (C/1997 L1) is a long-period comet first identified by David D. Balam on June 8, 1997 and originally photographed by Jin Zhu on June 3, 1997.  The comet is estimated at 10 kilometres in diameter with a period of approximately 36,800 years.

Given the orbital eccentricity of this object, different epochs can generate quite different heliocentric unperturbed two-body best-fit solutions to the aphelion distance (maximum distance) of this object.  For objects at such high eccentricity, the Suns barycentric coordinates are more stable than heliocentric coordinates. Using JPL Horizons the barycentric orbital elements for epoch 2015-Jan-01 generate a semi-major axis of 1100 AU and a period of approximately 36,800 years.

References 

Non-periodic comets
Discoveries by SCAP
1997 in science
19970603